Emansipatsiya (Cyrillic: Эмансипация; translation: Emancipation) is the third compilation album by Nu Virgos.

Track listing

Release history

External links
 Official Website

2008 compilation albums
Nu Virgos albums
2008 remix albums